is a Japanese surname.  Anai can also be a surname of English & Irish origins 

People with the Japanese surname include:
Yuko Anai (穴井 夕子, born 1974), Japanese pop singer
Takamasa Anai (穴井 隆将, born 1984), Japanese judoka
Chihiro Anai (穴井 千尋, born 1996), Japanese pop singer, member of AKB48

Given name 
Anai is also a given name of multiple origins. From the Jamaican origin it means "beautiful", from the Indian (Sanskrit) origin it means "elephant", and from the Hebrew & Latin origin it means "God has favored me" or "grace". Anai can be a Spanish variation of Hannah

References

Japanese-language surnames